Hallaj-e Olya (also Romanized as Ḩallāj-e ‘Olyā) is a village in Qezel Uzan Rural District, in the Central District of Meyaneh County, East Azerbaijan Province, Iran. At the 2006 census, its population was 366, in 59 families.

References 

Populated places in Meyaneh County